Dasysphinx garleppi is a moth of the subfamily Arctiinae. It was described by Rothschild in 1911. It is found in Peru.

References

Euchromiina
Moths described in 1911